Meliphaga is a genus of birds in the honeyeater family Meliphagidae.

The genus was introduced by the English artist John Lewin in 1808. The name Meliphaga combines the Ancient Greek  meaning "honey" and  meaning eating. The type species is Lewin's honeyeater (Meliphaga lewinii).
 
The genus contains three species:
 Puff-backed honeyeater (Meliphaga aruensis)
 Yellow-spotted honeyeater (Meliphaga notata)
 Lewin's honeyeater (Meliphaga lewinii)

The genus formerly included additional species. When molecular phylogenetic studies found that Meliphaga contained two distinct clades, the genus was split and most of the species were moved to the resurrected genus Microptilotis leaving just three species in Meliphaga.

References

 
Bird genera
Taxonomy articles created by Polbot